William Buehler Seabrook (February 22, 1884 – September 20, 1945) was an American occultist, explorer, traveler,  journalist and writer, born in Westminster, Maryland. He began his career as a reporter and City Editor of the Augusta Chronicle in Georgia, worked at the New York Times, and later became a partner in an advertising agency in Atlanta. He is well known for his  writing on, and engaging in, cannibalism.

Early life

Seabrook graduated from Mercersburg Academy. He then attended Roanoke College, received a master's degree from Newberry College, and studied philosophy at the University of Geneva in Switzerland.

In 1915, he joined the American Field Service of the French Army and served in World War I. He was gassed at Verdun in 1916 and was later awarded the Croix de Guerre. The following year, he became a reporter for the New York Times and soon became an itinerant.

Besides his books, Seabrook published articles in popular magazines including Cosmopolitan, Reader's Digest, and Vanity Fair.

Family life
In 1912, Seabrook married his first wife, Katherine Pauline Edmondson. They divorced in 1934. Soon after, he married Marjorie Worthington in 1935. The marriage ended in 1941. This was followed up by his marriage to Constance Kuhr, which began in 1942 and ended with his death in 1945.

Cannibalism
In the 1920s, Seabrook traveled to western Africa and came across a tribe who partook in the eating of human meat. Seabrook writes about his experience of cannibalism in his novel Jungle Ways, however, Seabrook later admitted the tribe did not allow him to join in on the ritualistic cannibalism. Instead, he obtained samples of human flesh from a hospital and cooked it himself.

Later life
In autumn 1919, English occultist Aleister Crowley spent a week with Seabrook at Seabrook's farm. Seabrook went on to write a story based on the experience and to recount the experiment in Witchcraft: Its Power in the World Today.

In 1924, he travelled to Arabia and sampled the hospitality of various tribes of Bedouin and the Kurdish Yazidi. In the first part of the book, Seabrook seeks out Mithqal Al-Fayez and lives with him and his tribe for several months. When the topic of religion came to them in conversation, Seabrook admitted to Mithqal that he did not believe in the Trinity, but rather in the oneness of god, and that god sent many prophets including Muhammad; on hearing this, Mithqal asked if William would like to enter Islam and William agreed, with him repeating the Shahada after Mithqal shortly after. His account of his travels, Adventures in Arabia: among the Bedouins, Druses, Whirling Dervishes and Yezidee Devil Worshipers was published in 1927; it was sufficiently successful to allow him to travel to Haiti, where he developed an interest in Haitian Vodou and the Culte des Mortes, which were described at length in his book The Magic Island. The book is credited with introducing the concept of a zombie to popular culture.

Seabrook had a lifelong fascination with the occult, which he witnessed and described firsthand both in Third World countries, as documented in The Magic Island (1929), and Jungle Ways (1930).  He later concluded that he had seen nothing that did not have a rational scientific explanation, a theory which he detailed in Witchcraft: Its Power in the World Today (1940).

In Air Adventure he describes a trip on board a Farman with captain René Wauthier, a famed pilot, and Marjorie Muir Worthington, from Paris to Timbuktu, where he went to collect a mass of documents from Father Yacouba, a defrocked monk who had an extensive collection of rare documents about the obscure city at that time administered by the French as part of French Sudan. The book is replete with information about French colonial life in the Sahara and pilots in particular.

In December 1933, Seabrook was committed at his own request and with the help of some of his friends to Bloomingdale, a mental institution in Westchester County, near New York City, for treatment for acute alcoholism. He remained a patient of the institution until the following July and in 1935 published an account of his experience, written as if it were no more than another expedition to a foreign locale. The book, Asylum, became another best-seller. In the preface, he was careful to state that his books were not "fiction or embroidery".

He married Marjorie Muir Worthington in France, in 1935, after they had returned from a trip to Africa on which Seabrook was researching a book.  Due to his alcoholism and sadistic practices they divorced in 1941. She later wrote a biography, The Strange World of Willie Seabrook, which was published in 1966.

Death
On September 20, 1945, Seabrook committed suicide by drug overdose in Rhinebeck, New York. He left behind one son, William.

Popular culture 
The Abominable Mr. Seabrook is a graphic biography of Seabrook by Joe Ollmann.

Bibliography

Books
 Diary of Section VIII (1917)
 Adventures in Arabia (1927)
 The Magic Island (1929)
 Jungle Ways (1930)
 Air Adventure (1933)
 The White Monk of Timbuctoo (1934)
 Asylum (1935)
 These Foreigners: Americans All (1938)
 Witchcraft: Its Power in the World Today (1940)
 Doctor Wood: Modern Wizard of the Laboratory (1941)
 No Hiding Place: An Autobiography (1942)

Short stories
 "Wow!" (1921) Etext of the story, The Genesis of "WoW!", and A Note on the Text.

References

External links

Pictures
Undated pictures of William Seabrook are available:
 Cites the Osterreichische Nationalbibliothek.

1884 births
1945 suicides
20th-century American journalists
20th-century American male writers
American cannibals
American Field Service personnel of World War I
American male journalists
American occult writers
American travel writers
Drug-related suicides in New York (state)
Editors of Georgia (U.S. state) newspapers
People from Westminster, Maryland
The New York Times writers
Writers from Maryland
Writers from New York (state)
American Muslims
Converts to Islam from Christianity